Chad Elton Green  (born June 28, 1975) is an American former switch-hitting, right-handed minor league baseball outfielder.

Career
Green attended Mentor High School and then the University of Kentucky. Originally drafted by the Kansas City Royals in the ninth round of the  draft, Green opted not to sign. He competed for the United States in the 1996 Olympics, helping the U.S. win the bronze medal. Shortly thereafter, Green was drafted eighth overall by the Milwaukee Brewers.

He started his professional career that season, batting .358 in 21 games with the Ogden Raptors. He also showed good speed, stealing 12 bases.

Standing at 5'10", 180 pounds, Green's  season was not very successful. Playing for the High-A Stockton Ports, Green hit only .250 in 127 games. In 513 at-bats, he struck out 138 times and walked only 37 times. He did steal what would be a career high 37 bases that season. Even though he did not do too well in 1997, he was still considered the 99th best prospect by Baseball America.

He was promoted to the Double-A El Paso Diablos, where he played seven games and did not collect a single hit in six at-bats.

Like his 1997 season, his  season was unimpressive. In 116 games with class the Double-A Huntsville Stars, he hit only .246 with 109 strikeouts in 422 at-bats. He did steal 28 bases and hit a career-high 10 home runs.

 was the worst season thus far in his career. While with Huntsville, he hit only .233 in 85 games, stealing 19 bases. Still, he managed to make it to Triple-A, spending 43 games with the Indianapolis Indians. He hit only .203 with them.

In the 2000/ offseason, Green was traded with Santiago Perez to the San Diego Padres for Will Cunnane and Brandon Kolb.

He started 2001 in the Padres organization, but after hitting only .226 with the Double-A Mobile BayBears and .224 with the Portland Sea Dogs, he was released on July 4 of that year. He was signed by the Cleveland Indians on July 21, and played the rest of his season with the Double-A Akron Aeros. He hit .260 in 37 games with them.

After the 2001 season, he was granted free agency and signed with the Minnesota Twins before the  season. 2002 saw flashes of the Chad Green of old-while with the New Britain Rock Cats, he hit .329 in 20 games. Upon his promotion to the Triple-A Edmonton Trappers, he had an 18-game hitting streak going, but he hit only .218 with them.

His 12 stolen bases were nothing near what he used to be able to steal. After the 2003 season, he was granted free agency.

He did not play professional baseball in 2004. He was used as a pinch runner in a game for the Double-A Carolina Mudcats.

References

External links

1975 births
Living people
Akron Aeros players
All-American college baseball players
American expatriate baseball players in Canada
Baseball outfielders
Baseball players at the 1996 Summer Olympics
Baseball players from New York (state)
Carolina Mudcats players
Edmonton Trappers players
El Paso Diablos players
Huntsville Stars players
Indianapolis Indians players
Kentucky Wildcats baseball players
Medalists at the 1996 Summer Olympics
Mobile BayBears players
New Britain Rock Cats players
Ogden Raptors players
Olympic bronze medalists for the United States in baseball
People from Dunkirk, New York
Portland Beavers players
Rochester Red Wings players
Stockton Ports players